Victoria Park Road is a road in Causeway Bay, Hong Kong. Its western section between Gloucester Road and Island Eastern Corridor before the completion of Central–Wan Chai Bypass, served as a portion of Route 4. It starts at the junction of Route 1 and ends in Hing Fat Street. The road is 750 metres long and was built in 1972 by reclamation following the shoreline, along with the Cross-Harbour Tunnel. Its northern side abuts Causeway Bay Typhoon Shelter, while to its south is Victoria Park, after which it is named.

In 2022, the section of harbourfront between the road and Causeway Bay Typhoon Shelter was redeveloped and expanded, as part of the overall development of Victoria Harbour waterfront.

References

Former Part of Route 4 (Hong Kong)
Roads on Hong Kong Island
Causeway Bay